Man on Fire is a 2004 action thriller film directed by Tony Scott from a screenplay by Brian Helgeland, and based on the 1980 novel of the same name by A. J. Quinnell. The novel had previously been adapted into a feature film in 1987. In this film, Denzel Washington portrays John Creasy, a despondent, alcoholic former CIA SAD/SOG officer (and U.S. Marine Corps Force Reconnaissance captain) turned bodyguard, who goes on a revenge rampage after his charge, nine-year-old Lupita "Pita" Ramos (Dakota Fanning), is abducted in Mexico City. The supporting cast includes Christopher Walken, Radha Mitchell, Giancarlo Giannini, Marc Anthony, Rachel Ticotin and Mickey Rourke.

The film received mixed reviews. It grossed $130 million worldwide against a production budget of $60–70 million.

Plot
Former CIA SAD/SOG officer John W. Creasy visits his old friend Paul Rayburn in Mexico. Rayburn convinces him to take a bodyguard position with Samuel Ramos, a Mexico City automaker whose young daughter Lupita "Pita" requires a bodyguard for her kidnapping insurance policy to take effect. Struggling with alcoholism, burnout, and guilt over his actions with the CIA, Creasy tries to commit suicide but his gun misfires. Calling Rayburn in the middle of the night following this attempt, Creasy is reminded by his friend of their saying "a bullet always tells the truth" and begins to consider that he was not meant to die. Seemingly revitalized, Creasy commits to his newfound purpose as Pita's protector, reducing his drinking and finding comfort in the pages of his bible.  Creasy begins coaching Pita to become a more confident swimmer, bonding with her through the process.

Waiting outside Pita’s piano lesson, Creasy recognizes a car that followed them earlier, as two Federal Police officers block the street. Realizing that Pita is about to be abducted, Creasy kills four of the attackers including the officers but is critically wounded and Pita is taken. Recovering from his injuries, Creasy is declared a suspect, but reporter Mariana Garcia Guerrero questions the story. AFI agent Miguel Manzano relocates Creasy to a veterinary clinic to protect him from corrupt police.

"The Voice," leader of the kidnapping ring, demands a $10 million ransom and Samuel complies, with the help of police Lt. Victor Fuentes. However, the kidnappers are ambushed at the ransom drop and the Voice’s nephew is killed. Holding the Ramos responsible, the Voice informs them that Pita will be lost to them forever as retribution. Guerrero warns Creasy that the kidnappers belong to a powerful “brotherhood” called La Hermandad that consists of corrupt officials, police, and criminals, but Creasy promises Pita’s mother, Lisa, that he will kill everyone responsible for Pita's death.

With Rayburn’s help, Creasy obtains a small arsenal of weapons and equipment. He brutally interrogates and kills the getaway driver, who points him to a club where he confronts three of the kidnappers. Killing middleman "Jersey Boy" and another criminal, Creasy recovers an incriminating ATM card and another kidnapped girl. He turns both over to Guerrero, who reveals that Fuentes is part of the brotherhood. Manzano interviews Rayburn, who describes Creasy as an “artist of death”, about to "paint his masterpiece."

Guerrero convinces Manzano to help Creasy wage war against the kidnappers. Waylaying Fuentes’ motorcade with a rocket-propelled grenade, Creasy abducts the officer, who admits that he had his officers ambush the ransom drop, but discovered afterward most of the ransom money had already been stolen by Jordan Kalfus, Samuel's lawyer. After killing Fuentes with a bomb in his rectum, Creasy searches Kalfus’ home and finds his decapitated body and a fax with bank account information leading to Samuel.

Creasy confronts the Ramos, and Samuel confesses that Kalfus suggested they arrange Pita’s kidnapping to claim the insurance payout to pay his father's debts, though they were promised Pita would be returned unharmed. When Fuentes interfered with the drop, Samuel blamed Kalfus for Pita's death and killed him. Lisa, now aware of Samuel's involvement, angrily tells Creasy to kill her husband or she’ll do it herself; he leaves Samuel a gun and the same bullet he attempted suicide with, and a remorseful Samuel successfully shoots himself.

Guerrero and Manzano trace the ATM card to the Voice’s wife and find her address, allowing Manzano's officers to infiltrate her home and obtain a photo of the Voice. Despite the brotherhood’s threats, Guerrero publishes the photo and passes the address on to Creasy. Taking the Voice’s wife and his brother Aurelio prisoner, Creasy is shot in the chest but learns the ringleader’s real name is Daniel Sanchez. He calls Daniel and threatens his family, but Daniel reveals that Pita is alive, offering to trade her for his brother and for Creasy, which Creasy accepts.

Instructing Lisa to join him at the exchange, Creasy reunites with Pita in the middle of an overpass, assuring her that he loves her before sending her to her mother. He and Aurelio are taken by Daniel’s men, but Creasy succumbs to his wounds. Manzano tracks Daniel down later that day and shoots him dead “during the course of arrest.”

Cast
 Denzel Washington as John W. Creasy, a former CIA operative and U.S. Marine Force Recon Captain turned mercenary
 Dakota Fanning as Guadalupe "Lupita" (Pita) Ramos
 Radha Mitchell as Lisa Ramos, an American expatriate from Houston, Texas. 
 Christopher Walken as Paul Rayburn, who runs a security firm in Mexico. Marlon Brando was originally considered but his poor health prevented him from taking the role.
 Marc Anthony as Samuel Ramos
 Giancarlo Giannini as Miguel Manzano, director of the AFI. Tony Scott stated "Giancarlo loves women, as did this character."
 Mickey Rourke as Jordan Kalfus, Samuel Ramos' lawyer. Kalfus and Samuel Ramos's father were best friends, and therefore Kalfus has a close relationship with Samuel. Mickey Rourke stated that Kalfus has "a responsibility to his father, to him, to look out for his well-being." Therefore, Kalfus "[wants] to be there for him" when Ramos "gets his head underwater a little bit".
 Rachel Ticotin as Mariana Garcia Guerrero, a reporter for the Diario Reforma
 Roberto Sosa as Daniel Sanchez, "The Voice". He is based on a real kidnapper, Daniel Arizmendi López.
 Jesús Ochoa as Victor Fuentes, a lieutenant in the Anti-Kidnapping Division of the Federal Judicial Police and the head of the criminal "La Hermandad" syndicate
 Carmen Salinas as Guardian three
 Gero Camilo as Aurelio Sanchez. Based on Aurelio Arizmendi López, the brother of Daniel Arizmendi López.
 Rosa María Hernández as Maria Rosas Sanchez, wife of The Voice.
 Charles Paraventi as Jersey Boy, proprietor of the rave in Neza and an accomplice to Pita's kidnapping.
 Mario Zaragoza as Jorge Gonzalez, a Federal Judicial Policeman and member of the criminal "La Hermandad" syndicate, who physically kidnaps Pita off the street

Production
Tony Scott, the film's director, had tried to adapt the 1980 source novel, by A. J. Quinnell, into a film in 1983. Journalist Paul Davies theorized that movie producers likely believed that Scott, whose only directorial work as of the time was 1983's The Hunger, lacked the experience to direct this as his second film.

The novel was first adapted into the 1987 film Man on Fire, starring Scott Glenn as Creasy. This movie, like the novel, was set in Italy, then a major center of kidnapping.

When a remake was first under consideration, producer Arnon Milchan (who also produced the 1987 version) looked at Michael Bay and Antoine Fuqua to direct, before asking Scott if he was still interested.

20th Century Fox wanted the film to still be set in Italy. An early draft of the script was set in Naples, with early reporting suggesting that the Mexico City filming was an odd stand in for Naples. Scott argued that if the setting would be Italy, then the film would have to be a period piece, since by the 2000s kidnappings had become a rare occurrence in Italy. Mexico City became the setting of the 2004 film because Mexico City had a high kidnapping rate, and for other reasons unspecified. As a result, the character Rika Balletto was renamed Lisa Martin Ramos, and Pinta Balletto was renamed Lupita "Pita" Ramos. Ettore Balletto became Samuel Ramos. Robert De Niro was originally offered the role of Creasy. Marlon Brando was the original choice to play Rayburn.

Reception
Man on Fire opened in the U.S. on April 23, 2004, in 2,980 theaters and grossed $22,751,490 with an average of $7,634 and ranking No. 1 at the box office. The film's widest release was 2,986 theaters and it ended up earning $77,911,774 in North America and $52,381,940 internationally for a total of $130,293,714 worldwide, against its $60–70 million production budget. The film was successful in the U.S. home video market, grossing more than $123 million in DVD and VHS rentals and sales in U.S.

On Rotten Tomatoes the film has a rating of 38% based on 169 reviews, with an average rating of 5.30/10. The consensus states, "Man on Fire starts out well, but goes over the top in the violent second half." On Metacritic the film has a score of 47 out of 100 based on 36 reviews, indicating "mixed or average reviews". Audiences polled by CinemaScore gave the film a grade "A-" on scale of A to F.

Paul Davies, a journal article author, said that the critical reception to Man on Fire in the United States was "somewhat less than kind" because critics did not like the vigilantism that Creasy uses. Davies argues that "most critics missed" Creasy not taking "sadistic pleasure" in the killings since he kills to get information to get to all of the people involved in the kidnapping of Pita Ramos, and does not like harming innocent parties.

A. J. Quinnell had a favorable reception to this adaptation, mainly because the film used many of the book's lines. Quinnell said that usually screenwriters "like to leave their mark on the product." Quinnell added that even though he usually dislikes film adaptations of books, the writers "did a good job with Man On Fire and I loved the chemistry between Creasy and the girl" and "When I first heard Denzel was playing the part of Creasy I missed a couple of heartbeats but he played the part brilliantly. The film is violent and if the anger is not portrayed properly, the result can be awful." Kevin Freese of the Foreign Military Studies Office stated that "it appears that the allusion" of the fictional Sánchez brothers with the real Arizmendi brothers "escaped the comprehension of much of the audience."

Accolades

Soundtrack
The cut "Smiling", from the soundtrack composed by Harry Gregson-Williams, has been adopted as the theme of a number of television commercials for Omega Watches in 2012 to 2013. The soundtrack containing 20 tracks, was composed by Harry Gregson-Williams, and was released on July 27, 2004.

The film heavily features the work of Nine Inch Nails. Trent Reznor is credited as "Musical Consultant". The movie features six Nine Inch Nails songs.

Remake
In 2005, a Hindi remake of the film by director Apoorva Lakhia, called Ek Ajnabee, was released. It starred Amitabh Bachchan as the lead (named Suryaveer "Surya" Singh). The same year, it was also remade in Tamil language as Aanai starring Arjun Sarja.

See also
 Cinema of the United States
 List of American films of 2004

References

External links

 Man on Fire official website (Archive)
 
 
 

2004 action thriller films
2004 action drama films
2004 films
20th Century Fox films
2000s vigilante films
American action drama films
American action thriller films
American films about revenge
American vigilante films
2000s English-language films
Estudios Churubusco films
Films about child abduction
Films about families
Films about murderers
Films based on British novels
Films based on crime novels
Films directed by Tony Scott
Films produced by Lucas Foster
Films scored by Harry Gregson-Williams
Films set in 2003
Films set in Mexico
Films set in Mexico City
Films with screenplays by Brian Helgeland
Regency Enterprises films
Scott Free Productions films
Films produced by Arnon Milchan
2000s American films